Wadi Halfa or Halfa is a district of Northern state, Sudan. Its population was 33,631 in 2008.

References

Districts of Sudan